Ferenc Nagy may refer to:
 Ferenc Nagy (1903-1979), Prime Minister of Hungary
 Ferenc Nagy (boxer) (1916-1977), Hungarian Olympic boxer
 Ferenc Nagy (sailor) (born 1956), Hungarian Olympic sailor
 Ferenc Nagy (footballer), Hungarian footballer and coach
 Ferenc József Nagy (1923-2019), Hungarian politician